The U.S. state of Wisconsin first required its residents to register their motor vehicles and display license plates in 1905. Plates are currently issued by the Wisconsin Department of Transportation (WisDOT) through its Division of Motor Vehicles. Front and rear plates are required for most classes of vehicles, while only rear plates are required for motorcycles and trailers.

Passenger baseplates

1905 to 1941

1942 to 1952

1953 to 1967
The 1956 (dated 1957) issue was the first Wisconsin license plate that complied with these standards.

1968 to present

Specialty plates

Non-passenger plates

Light truck and bus plates

Heavy truck and trailer plates

Motorcycle and moped plates

Governmental plates

Dealer Plates

Miscellaneous

Discontinued

Tribal Plates
Tribal and indian nation plates are given to members and nonmembers who reside on their respective reservation. All truck plates start with "T", except for Oneida, which starts with "TK" in place of "7G" on 1999-2004 plates. Some have disabled plates available. Motorcycle plates are available for all plate designs. Plates also bear special-design expiration stickers unavailable to the rest of the state or other reservations.

References

External links
Wisconsin license plates, 1969–present

Wisconsin
Transportation in Wisconsin
Wisconsin transportation-related lists